A list of films produced in Hong Kong in 1962:.

1962

References

External links
 IMDB list of Hong Kong films
 Hong Kong films of 1962 at HKcinemamagic.com

1962
Hong Kong
Films